Luciano Sebastián Goux (born 27 January 1980) is an Argentinian football player, who plays for Defensores de Belgrano.

Career
He played the majority of his football in his native Argentina, with a stint in Malaysia in between. He played for Malaysian team Perak FA in the 2004 Super League Malaysia season, and helped Perak to win that year's Malaysia FA Cup, scoring in the final.

He played for Chilean team Everton de Viña del Mar in 2012-2013, before joining his current club Defensores de Belgrano in 2013.

Personal
He is the younger brother of Marcelo Goux, also a footballer.

References

External links

BDFA profile

1980 births
Living people
Sportspeople from Lanús
Argentine footballers
Argentine expatriate footballers
Association football defenders
Estudiantes de Buenos Aires footballers
Deportivo Laferrere footballers
Club Atlético Sarmiento footballers
Defensa y Justicia footballers
CSyD Tristán Suárez footballers
Club Atlético Atlanta footballers
Perak F.C. players
Everton de Viña del Mar footballers
Defensores de Belgrano footballers
Primera B de Chile players
Argentine expatriate sportspeople in Chile
Argentine expatriate sportspeople in Malaysia
Expatriate footballers in Chile
Expatriate footballers in Malaysia